The Comedy Theatre is a 1003-seat theatre in Melbourne's East End Theatre District. It was built in 1928, and was designed in the Spanish style, with a Florentine-style exterior and wrought-iron balconies. It is located at 240 Exhibition Street, and diagonally opposite Her Majesty's Theatre.

It typically hosts commercial seasons of plays and smaller-scale musicals, as well as comedy and other entertainment events.

History 
The site at the corner of Lonsdale and Stephen streets was from June 1842 to October 1854 an entertainment venue, "Rowe's American Circus", where G. B. W. Lewis gained his foothold in Australia. In December 1854 it was licensed as the "Royal Victoria Theatre", then demolished, to be replaced by a prefabricated iron building imported from Manchester, England for George Coppin. Tentatively named "New Theatre", it was christened on 11 June 1855 as "Coppin's Olympic Theatre", and held its first theatrical performance on 30 July.
One of Melbourne's earliest play-houses, it was the venue of some of G. V. Brooke's greatest triumphs, but the "Iron Pot", as it came to be known, was hot in summer and cold in winter and was soon displaced by architecturally superior theatres, and was abandoned in 1894.

Opened on 28 April 1928, the Comedy Theatre was built and operated for fifty years by J. C. Williamson's. Paul Dainty purchased the theatre in 1978 for $800,000. Since 1996 the theatre has been owned and operated by Marriner Group.

Previous productions 
Previous notable productions and performers at the Comedy Theatre include:

Gallery

References

External links

 
Comedy Theatre, Melbourne, Victorian Heritage Database

Theatres in Melbourne
Buildings and structures in Melbourne City Centre
1928 establishments in Australia
Theatres completed in 1928